Iglinsky (masculine) or Iglinskaya (feminine) is a last name. It is shared by the following people:
Maxim Iglinsky (b. 1981), road racing cyclist from Kazakhstan
Valentin Iglinsky (b. 1984), road racing cyclist from Kazakhstan